The Pagotto Brakogyro is a series of Italian autogyros, designed by Enio Pagotto and produced by Carpenterie Pagotto of Pianzano. The aircraft is supplied as a complete ready-to-fly-aircraft.

Design and development
The Brakogyro features a single main rotor, an open cockpit with a windshield with two seats in tandem, tricycle landing gear with wheel pants and a four-cylinder, air- and liquid-cooled, four-stroke, dual-ignition Rotax 912S engine with a custom-designed turbocharger that produces , mounted in pusher configuration. The  turbocharged Rotax 914 powerplant is also available, but at higher cost.

The aircraft fuselage is made from welded stainless steel tubing, with a non-structural composite cockpit fairing. The aircraft has a triple tail mounted on the tail boom tube.

Variants
Brakogyro GT
Model with composite cockpit fairing.
NAKEd
Open model without the cockpit fairing, but fitted with a single rollbar and skids in front of the main landing gear.

Specifications (Brakogyro GT)

References

External links

2000s Italian sport aircraft
Single-engined pusher autogyros